Mohd Syamsul Mohd Yusof (born 21 May 1984) is a Malaysian actor, film director, writer, producer and singer. He is the son of producer and director Yusof Haslam. He is the youngest director to win the Malaysian Film Festival for Best Director award, doing so at the age of 25.

Having won best director awards six times ever since at the Malaysian Film Festival and Anugerah Skrin, and was named Best Director at the 57th Asia Pacific Film Festival in Cambodia for his work in the horror/religious movie Munafik. In 2018, its sequel, Munafik 2, set a record as the highest grossing Malaysian film, which it held until it was surpassed by Mohd Syamsul's 2022 epic war film Mat Kilau.

Early life
Syamsul Yusof was born on 21 May 1984 and grew up in Kuala Lumpur. He is the son of famed director; Yusof Haslam. His brother, Syafiq Yusof is a well-known film director. His cousins, Rizal Ashreff and Sabrina Ali and half-brother, the late Faizal Yusof are also actors. Syafiq and Faizal themselves also have their other careers as film directors. He studied at the Malaysia Institute of Integrative Media (MIIM) or also known as Academy TV3 where he took a diploma in Film, TV Broadcasting and Journalism courses.

Career
From 2003 to 2007, Syamsul Yusof started to direct and acted in many TV series for RTM and TV3 such as Gerak Khas, Sembilu Kasih, Air Mata Maria and Tragedi Oktober. In 2007, he direct his first feature film, Evolusi KL Drift, co-written by him and his cousin Rizal Ashreff was initially rejected by his father for further redrafting. After the revision, his first film project was finally approved alongside a budget of RM 1.35 million. Despite his lack of directing experience and the immense pressure of keeping reputation of his family, Evolusi KL Drift was well-received upon its release on 3 April 2008. The film's success paved the way for several other directorial endeavours.

After the success of his directorial debut; his sophomore film Bohsia: Jangan Pilih Jalan Hitam, which had gained unwanted publicity due to the film title's issues with the vulgar language used and certain copyright issues. but he managed to pull through. The film managed to become successful despite the controversy. Next, he continued to direct the sequel to Evolusi KL Drift which released on 25 March 2010. The film was a critical and box-office success, with Syamsul bagging the Best Director award at the 23rd Malaysia Film Festival.

In 2011, he directed his first horror film Khurafat: Perjanjian Syaitan starring himself and Liyana Jasmay in lead roles. Released on 13 January 2011, it collected a gross collection of RM 8 million to the surprise of film thespians. Critics gave praise to his first attempt in directing the horror film. He also added his year's roster with KL Gangster, being careful in its production. The film collected a gross of almost RM 12 million, twice what his father achieved through Sembilu II, despite competition from foreign films screening during that time. The movie also won him the 24th Malaysia Film Festival's Best Director award for two years in a row.

He directed Aku Bukan Tomboy, his first comedy film starring Scha Alyahya as Farisha/Eisha. The movie was released on 17 November 2011, later followed by Jalan Kembali: Bohsia 2 (sequel to 2009 film) and KL Gangster 2. After three years of absence, Syamsul came back with his latest film, Munafik, was released to Malaysian cinemas in February 2016. Eleven months later, he starred as mentally-disturbed guy named Aiman in a mystery science fiction film Desolasi, directed by his brother Syafiq Yusof which was released on 8 December 2016. Syamsul appear in biographical romantical film Makrifat Cinta which was released in February 2018.

Syamsul also dabbles in a music. He produced an EP with Anwar Fazal, entitled The Love Legacy back then. The EP contained four songs - "Bidadari", "Apakah Semuanya Itu" (used as the soundtrack for Evolusi KL Drift 2), "Ya Robbi" (soundtrack for Khurafat) and "Hingga Hujung Dunia" (soundtrack for Aku Bukan Tomboy). In 2016, he released a new single which was a collaboration with singer Mawi, "Kalah Dalam Menang". The song was used as the theme song for his latest film, Munafik. He continued his collaboration with Mawi for a later songs, titled "Bukan Propaganda" used as a soundtrack for Desolasi.

In the month of October 2020, Syamsul confirmed on his Instagram account that he is working on a screenplay for Munafik 3, a sequel to the highly successful Munafik 2 and the third entry in the Munafik film series.

Personal life 
Syamsul married actress Puteri Sarah Liyana Megat Kamaruddin on 8 March 2014. They have two children, Syaikhul Islam (born 2017) and Sumayyah (born 2019). On 16 January 2023, Puteri Sarah went on Syariah Court to annul her marriage with Syamsul due to his second marriage with actress Ira Kazar whom he wed in Thailand on the 6 January 2023.

Filmography

Film

Television series

Telemovie

Television

Discography
EP
 "The Love Legacy" (2012; with Dr. Anwar Fazal)

Single
 "Kalah Dalam Menang" (2016; featuring Mawi)
 "Bukan Propaganda" (2016; featuring Mawi)
 "Senorita" (2017; featuring Dato' AC Mizal & Shuib Sepahtu)
 "Selamat Tinggal Masa" (2018; featuring Black)
 "Menangislah" (2018; featuring Mawi)
 "Satu Kalimah" (2020)
 "GK Undercover" (2021)

Awards and nominations

References

External links
 
 

1984 births
Living people
Malaysian male actors
Malaysian film directors
People from Kuala Lumpur
Malaysian people of Malay descent
Malaysian people of Pakistani descent
Malay-language film directors
Malaysian child actors